Ahn Seok-Ho  (born January 5, 1986) is a South Korean football player who since 2007 has played for Suwon Samsung Bluewings.

References 
 Suwon Samsung 2008 squad list

1986 births
Living people
South Korean footballers
Suwon Samsung Bluewings players
K League 1 players
Association football defenders